The medial vestibular nucleus (Schwalbe nucleus) is one of the vestibular nuclei. It is located in the medulla oblongata.

Lateral vestibulo-spinal tract (lateral vestibular nucleus “Deiters”)- via ventrolateral medulla and spinal cord to ventral funiculus (lumbo-sacral segments). ..Ipsilaterally for posture

Medial vestibulo-spinal tract (medial, lateral, inferior, vestibular nuclei), bilateral projection via descending medial longitudinal fasciculus to cervical segments. DESCENDING MLF..Bilaterally for head/neck/eye movements

It is one of the nuclei that corresponds to CN VIII, corresponding to the vestibular nerve, which joins with the cochlear nerve.

It receives its blood supply from the Posterior Inferior Cerebellar Artery, which is compromised in the lateral medullary syndrome.

See also
 Vestibular nerve
 Vestibular system

References

External links
 https://web.archive.org/web/20111109232230/http://www.neuroanatomy.wisc.edu/virtualbrain/BrainStem/13VNAN.html

Cranial nerve nuclei